Events in the year 1890 in Norway.

Incumbents
Monarch – Oscar II
Prime Minister –

Events

Arts and literature

Sult, novel by Knut Hamsun is published.

Births

January to June
10 January – Kirsten Utheim Toverud, pediatrician (died 1949).
16 January – Henry Reinholt, footballer (died 1980).
23 January – Leon Aurdal, painter (died 1949).
13 February – Georg Tysland, engineer and metallurgist
18 March – Gunnar Andersen, international soccer player and ski jumper (died 1968)
26 April – Arne Gjedrem, politician (died 1978)
11 May – Helge Løvland, decathlete and Olympic gold medallist (died 1984)
14 May – Olaf Johannessen, rifle shooter (died 1977)
14 May – Harald Houge Torp, politician (died 1972)
7 June – Hjalmar Riiser-Larsen, aviation pioneer, polar explorer and businessman (died 1965)

July to September
10 July – Marie Ingeborg Skau, politician (died 1966)
25 July – Torleiv Corneliussen, sailor and Olympic gold medallist (died 1975)
31 July – Håkon Tønsager, rower (died 1975)
19 August – Konrad Knudsen, painter, journalist and politician (died 1959)
29 August – Peder Furubotn, cabinetmaker and politician (died 1975).
3 September – Per Fokstad, teacher, politician and intellectual (died 1973)
17 September – Sverre Grøner, gymnast and Olympic silver medallist (died 1972)

October to December
1 October – Halfdan Haneborg Hansen, military officer, Milorg pioneer and businessman (died 1974).
23 October – Anders Johanneson Bøyum, politician (died 1962)
23 November – Frithjof Olstad, rower and Olympic bronze medallist (died 1956)
14 December – Sigurd Hoel, author and publishing consultant (died 1960)

Full date unknown
John Aae, politician (died 1968)
Harald Langhelle, newspaper editor and politician (died 1942)
Ragnar Skancke, politician and Minister (died 1948)
Bjørn Talén, opera singer (died 1945)

Deaths

Full date unknown
Ole Andreas Bachke, politician and Minister (born 1830)
Paul Peter Vilhelm Breder, politician (born 1816)
Svend Adolph Solberg, politician (born 1831)
Jacob Tostrup, goldsmith and jeweller (born 1806)
 Clara Ursin, actress and singer (born 1828)

See also

References